Jeffrey "Jeff" de Luna (born  February 14, 1984) is a Filipino professional pool player from Manila. 

During the 2006 Men's World Nine-ball Championship he survived the group stages, the round of 64 and the round of 32, but was eliminated in the round of 16 by Luong Chi Dung. This performance secured him a spot in the 2007 edition of the tournament.

At the 2006 Asian Games in Qatar, de Luna made to the final of the nine-ball singles. However, he lost to his compatriot Antonio Gabica in the final and had to settle for a silver medal. In 2009, de Luna was also a runner-up to Ricky Yang in the first-ever Philippine Open Ten-ball Championship.

Personal life
De Luna has a wife named Dianne.

Titles and achievements
 2020 Meucci Classic 10-Ball 
 2020 Meucci Classic 9-Ball 
 2014 Manny Pacquiao Cup 10-Ball Doubles Championship
 2011 Star Billiards 10-Ball Event 
 2007 Manny Pacquiao 9-Ball Open

References

External links
Billiard Philippines profile

Living people
1984 births
Filipino pool players
Sportspeople from Manila
Place of birth missing (living people)
Asian Games medalists in cue sports
Cue sports players at the 2006 Asian Games
Asian Games silver medalists for the Philippines
Medalists at the 2006 Asian Games